Stoicism and Christianity may refer to:
 Christianity and Hellenistic philosophy
 Neostoicism